Scopula asellaria is a moth of the family Geometridae. It was described by Gottlieb August Wilhelm Herrich-Schäffer in 1847. It is found in southern Europe and North Africa.

The larvae feed on the flowers of Silene species.

Subspecies
Scopula asellaria asellaria
Scopula asellaria dentatolineata (Wehrli, 1926) (Spain)
Scopula asellaria gerstbergeri (Hausmann, 1993) (Canary Islands)
Scopula asellaria isabellaria (Milliére, 1868) (Spain)
Scopula asellaria lenzi (Hausmann, 1993) (Morocco)
Scopula asellaria philipparia (Prout, 1913) (Algeria)
Scopula asellaria romanaria (Milliére, 1869) (Italy)
Scopula asellaria tripolitana (Turati, 1930) (Libya)

References

External links

Lepiforum e.V.

Moths described in 1847
asellaria
Moths of Europe
Moths of Africa
Taxa named by Gottlieb August Wilhelm Herrich-Schäffer